Azerbaijan competed in the Junior Eurovision Song Contest 2021 in Paris, France on 19 December. Azerbaijani public television channel İctimai Television (İTV) internally selected Sona Azizova to represent the country with the song "One of Those Days".

Background 

In 2018, Fidan Huseynova represented the country with the song "I Wanna Be Like You", and placed 16th with 47 points, out of 20 countries. The country did not return to the contest after 2018, until 2021.

Before Junior Eurovision 
İTV announced their return to the contest on 16 August 2021, along with the selected artist. The broadcaster started a song selection process in which composers could submit songs until September 10, after which the entry will be selected internally by a jury of Azerbaijani and international experts. Azizova said she hoped for a rock-style song.

Head of delegation Isa Melikov has said about the country's participation: "We are quite ambitious. After 3 years of absence, we need a hit song to be remembered. Regardless of the genre, we will do our best." Their selected artist was Sona Azizova (born 25 March 2009) with the song "One of Those Days". Azizova had previously participated in the first season of The Voice Kids Azerbaijan and placed second. She also performed at the Winter International Kids Music Festival.

At Junior Eurovision
After the opening ceremony, which took place on 13 December 2021, it was announced that Azerbaijan would perform fourteenth on 19 December 2021, following France and preceding Netherlands.

At the end of the contest, Azerbaijan received 151 points, placing 5th out of 19 participating countries, giving Azerbaijan its best result in the contest .

Voting

Detailed voting results

References 

Azerbaijan
2021
Junior Eurovision Song Contest